The French Dispatch of the Liberty, Kansas Evening Sun, or simply The French Dispatch, is a 2021 American anthology comedy drama film written, directed, and produced by Wes Anderson from a story he conceived with Roman Coppola, Hugo Guinness, and Jason Schwartzman. It features an expansive ensemble cast and follows three different storylines as the French foreign bureau of the fictional Liberty, Kansas Evening Sun newspaper publishes its final issue.

The first segment, "The Concrete Masterpiece", follows an incarcerated and unstable painter, and stars Benicio del Toro, Adrien Brody, Tilda Swinton and Léa Seydoux. The second, "Revisions to a Manifesto", is inspired by the May 68 student protests, and stars Frances McDormand, Timothée Chalamet, and Lyna Khoudri. "The Private Dining Room of the Police Commissioner" features Jeffrey Wright, Mathieu Amalric, and Stephen Park, and follows the kidnapping of a police commissioner's son. Bill Murray also stars as Arthur Howitzer Jr., the paper's editor, while Owen Wilson appears in a short segment that introduces the film's fictional setting of Ennui-sur-Blasé.

The project was first mentioned in August 2018 as an untitled musical set after World War II. That December, the film was officially announced, with Anderson calling it a "love letter to journalists". Filming took place between November 2018 and March 2019, with cinematographer Robert D. Yeoman, in the city of Angoulême, France. In post-production, editing was completed by Andrew Weisblum and the score was composed by Alexandre Desplat.

Following a delay from 2020, The French Dispatch premiered at the Cannes Film Festival on July 12, 2021, and was theatrically released in the United States by Searchlight Pictures on October 22, 2021. It received generally positive reviews, with praise for its score, production design, and performances. It has grossed $46 million worldwide against its budget of $25 million.

Plot
In 1975, in the fictional French town of Ennui-sur-Blasé (from French, literally, "boredom on apathetic"), Arthur Howitzer Jr., the editor of the magazine The French Dispatch, dies suddenly of a heart attack. According to the wishes expressed in his will, publication of the magazine is immediately suspended following one final farewell issue, in which four articles are published, along with an obituary.

The Cycling Reporter
Herbsaint Sazerac delivers a cycling tour of Ennui-sur-Blasé, demonstrating several key areas such as the arcade, Le Sans Blague café and a pickpocket's alleyway. He compares the past and the present of each place, demonstrating how much and yet how little has changed in Ennui over time.

The Concrete Masterpiece
J.K.L. Berensen delivers a lecture at the art gallery of her former employer, Upshur "Maw" Clampette, in which she details the career of Moses Rosenthaler. Rosenthaler, a mentally disturbed artist serving a sentence in the Ennui prison for murder, paints an abstract nude portrait of Simone, a prison officer with whom he develops a relationship. Julien Cadazio, an art dealer also serving a sentence for tax evasion, is immediately taken by the painting and buys it despite Rosenthaler's protests. Upon his release, Cadazio convinces his family of art exhibitors to put it on display, and Rosenthaler soon becomes a sensation in the art world. Privately, Rosenthaler struggles with inspiration to the point of near-suicide, and devotes himself to a long-term project at Simone's challenging.

Three years later, Cadazio, his uncles, Clampette, Berensen, and a mob of artists inspired by Rosenthaler, all frustrated at the lack of further paintings, bribe their way into the prison to confront him, only to discover that his masterpiece is in fact a series of frescoes in the concrete prison hall. Angered that the paintings are irremovable from the prison, Cadazio gets into a physical altercation with Rosenthaler, but soon comes to appreciate the paintings for what they are, and later arranges for the entire wall to be airlifted out of the prison into a private museum in Kansas, owned by Clampette. For his actions in halting a prison riot that breaks out during the reveal of the paintings, Rosenthaler is released on probation. Simone also departs after earning a great sum of money for becoming the inspiration and motivation for Rosenthaler during his incarceration. Simone and Rosenthaler maintain correspondence following his release, but never see each other again.

Revisions to a Manifesto
Lucinda Krementz reports on a student protest breaking out in the streets of Ennui that soon boils over into the "Chessboard Revolution", so-called for the students using chess to communicate with the police. While the revolution initially is inspired by petty concerns over access to the girls' dormitory, the traumatic military conscription of one student, Mitch-Mitch, inspires greater uprising.

Despite her insistence on maintaining "journalistic neutrality", Krementz has a brief romance with Zeffirelli, a self-styled leader of the revolt, and secretly helps him write his manifesto and adds an appendix. Juliette, a fellow revolutionary, is unimpressed with his manifesto. After they briefly express their disagreement about its contents, Krementz discovers that Juliette is in fact infatuated with Zeffirelli and is jealous of her closeness with him. She then tells the two to "go make love", which they do.

A few weeks later, Zeffirelli dies attempting repairs on the tower of a revolutionary pirate radio station, and soon a photograph of his likeness becomes symbolic of the movement. Five years later, Krementz translates Mitch-Mitch's theatrical dramatization of his conscription, and Zeffirelli's death, for a National Playhouse production of his play (at the downstairs Knoblock Theatre).

The Private Dining Room of the Police Commissioner

During a television interview, Roebuck Wright recounts the story of his attending a private dinner with The Commissaire of the Ennui police force, prepared by legendary police officer/chef Lt. Nescaffier. Nescaffier is a famous specialist in a kind of haute cuisine specifically designed to be eaten by working police officers.  The dinner is disrupted when the Commissaire's son Gigi is kidnapped and held for ransom by criminals, led by a failed musician labelled The Chauffeur.

The kidnappers represent the warring criminal syndicates of Ennui-sur-Blasé, and demand the release of an underworld accountant Albert, nicknamed "the Abacus", who possesses their shared financial records. The Abacus is being held in a solitary confinement cell at police headquarters. Wright recollects his own imprisonment in that same cell for his homosexuality, for which he was bailed out by Howitzer and offered a job at the Dispatch.

Following a shoot-out at the kidnapper's hideout, Gigi manages to sneak out a message in Morse code to "send the cook". Lt. Nescaffier is sent into the kidnappers' hideout, ostensibly to provide both them and Gigi with food, but secretly the food is laced with poison. The criminals all succumb to the poison except Gigi and The Chauffeur as neither ate the poisoned radishes, and Nescaffier just barely survives (due to his strong stomach). The Chauffeur escapes with Gigi, and leads the police on a chase. Gigi manages to escape through the car's sunroof and reunites with his father. During his recovery, Nescaffier saves The Abacus from starving to death by preparing him an omelette, the prisoner having been totally forgotten in the commotion.

Back at the Dispatch office, Howitzer tells Wright to reinsert a deleted segment. In it, a recovering Nescaffier tells Wright that the taste of the poison was unlike anything he had ever eaten before, before they commiserate over the state of being foreigners in France, and outsiders to society as a whole. Howitzer and Wright disagree on whether this conversation is the heart of the piece.

Obituary
In an epilogue, the French Dispatch staff mourn Howitzer's death, but set to work putting together a final issue to honor his memory.

During the closing credits, there is a dedication to the following writers and editors, many of whom were associated with The New Yorker: Harold Ross, William Shawn, Rosamond Bernier, Mavis Gallant, James Baldwin, A. J. Liebling, S. N. Behrman, Lillian Ross, Janet Flanner, Lucy Sante, James Thurber, Joseph Mitchell, Wolcott Gibbs, St. Clair McKelway, Ved Mehta, Brendan Gill, E. B. White, and Katharine White, and additionally to Christophe, writer of the featured song "Aline". Accompanying the credits are covers of the French Dispatch which are reminiscent of The New Yorker covers.

Cast

The Cycling Reporter
 Owen Wilson as Herbsaint Sazerac, a travel writer and staff-member of the French Dispatch, based on Joseph Mitchell, a writer for The New Yorker

The Concrete Masterpiece

Revisions to a Manifesto

The Private Dining Room of the Police Commissioner

Obituary

Production

Background
The film has been described as "a love letter to journalists set at an outpost of an American newspaper in a fictional 20th-century French city", centering on four stories. It brings to life a collection of tales published in the eponymous The French Dispatch, based in the fictional French city of Ennui-sur-Blasé (literally Boredom-upon-Apathetic). The film is inspired by Anderson's love of The New Yorker, and some characters and events in the film are based on real-life equivalents from the magazine. Arthur Howitzer Jr., the Kansas-born editor of the Dispatch, was based on the New Yorker founding editor Harold Ross, who came from Colorado. A. J. Liebling served as a secondary inspiration for the character. The character Herbsaint Sazerac was inspired by the New Yorker writer Joseph Mitchell. The food journalist Roebuck Wright was based on an amalgamation of James Baldwin, Liebling and Tennessee Williams. The story "Revisions to a Manifesto" was inspired by Mavis Gallant's two-part article "The Events in May: A Paris Notebook", centering on the May 68 student protests. "The Concrete Masterpiece" was inspired by the 1951 feature "The Days of Duveen", a six-part profile on art dealer Lord Duveen, upon which the character Julien Cadazio (played by Adrien Brody) is modeled. The character Upshur "Maw" Clampette was based on art collector Dominique de Menil, and J.K.L. Berensen was inspired by art lecturer Rosamond Bernier.

When speaking to French publication Charente Libre in April 2019, Anderson said: "The story is not easy to explain . . . [It's about an] American journalist based in France [who] creates his magazine. It is more a portrait of this man, of this journalist who fights to write what he wants to write. It's not a movie about freedom of the press, but when you talk about reporters you also talk about what's going on in the real world."

Development and casting
In August 2018, it was reported Wes Anderson would write and direct an untitled musical film set in France, post World War II. In November 2018, it was announced Jeremy Dawson would produce the film, with Tilda Swinton and Mathieu Amalric starring in the film. Dawson also confirmed the film is not a musical. Additionally, Natalie Portman, Brad Pitt, and Léa Seydoux were rumored for roles in the film. In December 2018, it was announced Anderson would write and direct the film, with Frances McDormand, Bill Murray, Benicio del Toro, and Jeffrey Wright; Seydoux was confirmed to star in the film alongside Swinton and Amalric, with Steven Rales producing under his Indian Paintbrush banner and Fox Searchlight Pictures distributing. Timothée Chalamet's role was written with him in mind.

Later that month, Lois Smith and Saoirse Ronan joined the cast. In January 2019, Owen Wilson, Adrien Brody, Henry Winkler, Willem Dafoe, Bob Balaban, Steve Park, Denis Ménochet, Lyna Khoudri, Alex Lawther, Félix Moati, Benjamin Lavernhe, Guillaume Gallienne, and Cécile de France were cast. Robert D. Yeoman served as the film's cinematographer. In February 2019, it was announced Wally Wolodarsky, Fisher Stevens, Griffin Dunne, and Jason Schwartzman had joined the cast of the film. In April 2019, Christoph Waltz, Rupert Friend, and Elisabeth Moss were cast. Initially, Kate Winslet was also part of the cast, but had to exit the project to prepare for her next role in Ammonite.

Filming
Principal photography began in November 2018, in the city of Angoulême in southwestern France and wrapped in March 2019. Murray and Ronan, who had small roles, recorded their scenes in two days.

Cinematography
Director of photography Robert Yeoman shot The French Dispatch on 35 mm film using Kodak Vision3 200T 5213 for the color sequences, and Eastman Double-X 5222 for the black-and-white sequences, on Arricam Studio and Lite cameras provided by a studio in Paris. Anderson preferred classic methods for shooting the scenes. Accordingly, the crew used scaffolding and hauled equipment on ropes, rather than a Technocrane; and golf carts for transporting cameras, rather than camera cars. Most scenes were framed in 1.37:1 format (also known as Academy ratio), which Anderson used in his The Grand Budapest Hotel, and which was used for many of the French films that inspired The French Dispatch. Occasional scenes were shot in anamorphic format "mainly to make a bold dramatic statement", according to Yeoman. French New Wave films were primary sources of inspiration for Yeoman's lighting; In Cold Blood (1967, shot by Conrad Hall) was another major reference.

The animated segments were directed by Gwenn Germain, who previously worked on Anderson's Isle of Dogs. As a nod to Angoulême's comic heritage, they were done entirely by local illustrators. The team comprised a maximum of 15 people, with The Adventures of Tintin and Blake and Mortimer as their main inspirations. They took about seven months to complete. The visual effects were done by the UK-based company Koala FX.

Illustrator 
Javi Aznarez drew from his own imagination and memories to design the covers for this movie which were made to look like ‘New Yorker’-Style Magazine Covers .

Set design
Adam Stockhausen was responsible for the production design of The French Dispatch. Stockhausen and his team began the scouting process using Google Maps, looking for promising locations before visiting them in person. Stockhausen and Anderson envisioned a town which "felt like Paris but not as it is today – more a sort of memory of Paris, the Paris of Jacques Tati." The team eventually settled on Angoulême. Stockhausen estimates that over 125 sets were constructed, most of them on location around Angoulême. A former felt factory was converted into a makeshift movie studio for the crew. A real building in Angoulême was chosen as the basis for the Dispatch headquarters, enhanced with foreground sets and miniatures in order to create the symmetry typically seen in Anderson films.

Rena DeAngelo was The French Dispatch set decorator. DeAngelo and Anderson sought inspiration from French films such as The Red Balloon, The 400 Blows, Bande à part and Vivre sa vie, and researched an extensive photo collection of Paris from the mid-1800s through the 1950s and 1960s in order to "get a feeling of Paris when it was dirtier—still beautiful, but grimy." DeAngelo and her team sourced the furniture at Le Sans Blague café from various places in Paris, and the coffee cups were specially made in Limoges, a city famous for its porcelain. DeAngelo also shopped once a month during filming at prop houses and flea markets in Le Mans, from which she sourced the furniture for Roebuck Wright's office. Much of the rest of the film's furniture came from a local estate liquidator in Angoulême.

Rosenthaler's abstract paintings were created by the German-New Zealand visual artist (and Tilda Swinton’s partner) Sandro Kopp in a three-month-long process. Kopp cited the works of Frank Auerbach, Willem de Kooning and Francis Bacon as references, while insisting that the paintings must be "idiosyncratic" and would not "look too much like the work of any living or dead painter". He relocated to the French Dispatch set in Angoulême to create the paintings, working in the on-set studio. Kopp also served as Tony Revolori's hand-double for the scenes where the young Rosenthaler is seen painting.

Music
For the film's musical score, Wes Anderson teamed up with his long-time collaborators Alexandre Desplat and Randall Poster. Desplat enlisted pianist Jean-Yves Thibaudet to draw inspiration from composers Erik Satie and Thelonious Monk and pair him in unusual duos including harp, timpani, bassoon and tuba. Recording took place remotely due to the COVID-19 pandemic. The film's soundtrack album was released on CD and digitally on October 22, 2021 by ABKCO Records with a vinyl release planned for early 2022. The film's soundtrack album's only single, titled "Obituary", was released on September 14, 2021. The film's musical score was given an earlier separate release.

The French Dispatch: Original Score

The French Dispatch: Original Soundtrack

Release

Premiere and theatrical release
In September 2019, Searchlight Pictures acquired distribution rights to the film. It was set to premiere at the Cannes Film Festival on May 12, 2020, and get a wide release on July 24, but due to the COVID-19 pandemic, the festival was cancelled and the film was pulled from the schedule on April 3, 2020. The film was rescheduled for release on October 16, 2020, before being pulled from the schedule again on July 23, 2020.

The French Dispatch had its world premiere at the 2021 Cannes Film Festival. The film was screened at film festivals in Busan, South Korea, the Hamptons, London, Mill Valley, Montclair, New York, Twin Cities, Philadelphia, Wrocław, San Diego, and Zürich. There was a surprise screening at Telluride. It was released in limited theaters on October 22, 2021, followed by the wide expansion of October 29, 2021.

Home media
The film was released digitally on December 14, 2021, and was followed by a Blu-ray and DVD release on December 28, 2021 by Walt Disney Studios Home Entertainment.  The movie was released on Blu-ray in the UK as an HMV exclusive on 3rd April 2023.

Promotion 
In promoting the movie, pop-up exhibitions with recreations of film's sets emerged in Los Angeles, New York, and London for a limited run around the film's release. The London store sported Le Sans Blague café's storefront, and housed several props from the film, including costumes, and the Rosenthaler's mural.

Reception

Box office 
The French Dispatch has grossed $16.1million in the United States and Canada, and $30.2million in other territories, for a worldwide total of $46.3million.

In its limited opening weekend, it grossed $1.3 million from 52 theaters, for a per-venue average of $25,000, the best per-venue performance for a theatrically released film of the COVID-19 pandemic until Licorice Pizza released in November with a per-venue average of $86,289). It expanded to 788 theaters the following weekend and grossed $2.75 million. It continued to expand in its third weekend, making $2.6 million from 1,205 theaters.

Critical response
At the review aggregator website Rotten Tomatoes, 75% of 312 reviews are positive, with the film having an average rating of 7.1/10. The website's critics consensus reads: "A loving ode to the spirit of journalism, The French Dispatch will be most enjoyed by fans of Wes Anderson's meticulously arranged aesthetic." On Metacritic, the film has a weighted average score of 74 out of 100, based on 57 critics, indicating "generally favorable reviews".

David Rooney of The Hollywood Reporter praised the "hand-crafted visual delights and eccentric performances" and wrote: "While The French Dispatch might seem like an anthology of vignettes without a strong overarching theme, every moment is graced by Anderson's love for the written word and the oddball characters who dedicate their professional lives to it". Writing for The Guardian, Peter Bradshaw said: "It might not be at the very zenith of what he can achieve but for sheer moment-by-moment pleasure, and for laughs, this is a treat".

The French Dispatch was mentioned in lists of the best films of the year by The New Yorker (#1), The Forward (the best movie), IndieWire (#6), Esquire (#38), New Musical Express (#11), British Film Institute (#23) and Vogue (unlisted).

Accolades

See also
 Chansons d'Ennui Tip-Top, companion album to the film's soundtrack by Jarvis Cocker

References

External links
 
 Official screenplay

2021 films
2021 comedy-drama films
American films with live action and animation
American comedy-drama films
Films about chefs
Films about child abduction
Films about fictional painters
Films about journalists
Films about newspaper publishing
Films about police officers
Films about revolutionaries
Films about students
Films directed by Wes Anderson
Films partially in color
Films postponed due to the COVID-19 pandemic
Films produced by Wes Anderson
Films set in France
Films set in Kansas
Films set in prison
Films shot in France
Films with screenplays by Wes Anderson
Searchlight Pictures films
Films scored by Alexandre Desplat
Indian Paintbrush (production company) films
2020s English-language films
2020s American films
2020s avant-garde and experimental films